Streptomyces varsoviensis is a bacterium species from the genus of Streptomyces which has been isolated from soil. Streptomyces varsoviensis produces oxytetracycline and hygrobafilomycin.

See also 
 List of Streptomyces species

References

Further reading

External links
Type strain of Streptomyces varsoviensis at BacDive -  the Bacterial Diversity Metadatabase	

varsoviensis
Bacteria described in 1967